Krakus, Krak or Grakch was a legendary Polish prince, king and founder of Kraków, the ruler of the Lechitic tribe of Vistulans. Krakus is also credited with building Wawel Castle and slaying the Wawel Dragon by feeding it a dead sheep full of sulfur. The latter is how Krak the cobbler became Krakus the prince, and later king. The first recorded mention of Krakus, then spelled Grakch, is in the Chronica seu originale regum et principum Poloniae from 1190.

Historian J. Banaszkiewicz attributes Krak's name to a pre-Slavic word "krakula", meaning judge's staff. The same word-root is believed to have been used in Czech and Russian naming conventions. However, historians Cetwiński and Derwich suggest a different etymology, which seems more probable to some, with Krak, meaning simply an oak, a sacred tree, most often associated with the concept of genealogy.

Krakus Mound, which exists to this day, was previously believed to contain Krakus' remains. It has been the subject of thorough archeological research from 1934–38, however, no grave has ever been found in it. The mound has a diameter of over 50 meters. According to research, it was erected between the 8th and 10th centuries as a central element of an ancient grave site, which does not exist today.

The Krak and Princess Wanda legend appeared in the early Polish history written by Wincenty Kadlubek; a similar legend, that of Krok and Libussa, appeared in the early Czech history by Cosmas of Prague.

See also 
 Princess Wanda, Krak's daughter
 Krakus II, Krak's son
 Lech II, Krak's son

References 

 Krak or Krakus? at historycy.org (Polish)
'Krakus and the Dragon'. A puppet re-telling by the pupils of St. Mary's Primary, Gorleston

Nobility from Kraków
History of Kraków
Legendary Polish monarchs
Polish princes
Mythological city founders